Goenshari Gewog (Dzongkha: དགོམ་ཤ་རི་) is a gewog (village block) of Punakha District, Bhutan.

References 

Gewogs of Bhutan
Punakha District